Laskow may refer to the following places in Poland:
Łasków, Lublin Voivodeship
Lasków, Masovian Voivodeship
Lasków, Świętokrzyskie Voivodeship